Peter Therkildsen (born 13 June 1998) is a Danish footballer who plays for Haugesund.

References

Living people
1998 births
Association football defenders
Danish men's footballers
HB Køge players
Næstved Boldklub players
AC Horsens players
FK Haugesund players
Danish Superliga players
Eliteserien players
Danish expatriate sportspeople in Norway
Expatriate footballers in Norway